Christo Proykov (born 11 March 1946 in Sofia) is the Bulgarian Greek Catholic Bishop of Sofia. He was ordained a priest on 23 May 1971, then appointed Coadjutor Bishop of Sofia and Titular Bishop of Briula on 18 December 1993. On 6 January 1994 Proykov was ordained bishop and on 5 September 1995 he became Bishop of Sofia.

Biography
Born in Sofia on 11 March 1946. On 6 September 1970 he was ordained a deacon by Bishop Cyril Kourtev, and on 23 May 1971 - a priest by Bishop Methodius Stratiev. In 1980–1982, he specialized canon law at the Pontifical Oriental Institute in Rome, Italy. In 1982, he was a parish priest at the Cathedral of the Dormition in Sofia. In December 1991, he refounded the newspaper "Truth - Veritas", a continuation of the newspaper "Truth".

On 18 December 1993 is preconized as Bishop of Sofia-coadjutor Apostolic Exarchate and titular bishop of Briun. On 6 January 1994 was ordained a bishop in the Basilica "St. Peter" in Rome by Pope John Paul II, in co-service with Cardinal Giovanni Battista Re and Archbishop Josip Uhach.

Manages the Catholic Exarchate of 5 September 1995 Bishop Christo Proykov chairman of the Episcopal Conference of Bulgaria by 1995. The Episcopal Conference of Bulgaria is chairman of these committees:

 Commission for Clergy
 Commission for Catholic Education and for titles
 Council for pastoral care over migrants and travelers
 Council for pastoral care health service
On 15 May 2009 he was appointed by Pope Benedict XVI as a consultant to the Dicastery for the Eastern Churches of the Roman Curia.

Awards
On 15 November 2007 a ceremony was held of the Grand Cross "Pro piis meritis Melitensi" Order of Malta of Mgr. Proykov. Through awards Order of Malta expresses its gratitude to the Catholic Church in the country for helping to introduction of medicins as humanitarian aid during the 1990s.

The name and titles of Exarch Proykov in Latin are the following: Exc.mus ac Rev.mus D.nus Christo Proykov, Dei et Sedis Apostolicæ gratia Episcopus titularis Briulitanus, Exarcha Apostolicus Sophiæ pro catholicis ritus byzantini-slavi in Bulgaria commorantibus, Præses Conferentiæ Episcopalis Bulgariæ.

References
 Bishop Christo Proykov

External links

 

1946 births
Living people
Clergy from Sofia
20th-century Eastern Catholic bishops
21st-century Eastern Catholic bishops
Bulgarian Eastern Catholic bishops
Bulgarian Greek Catholic Church
Eastern Catholic bishops in Bulgaria